The 2010 BWF World Championships was the 18th tournament of the World Badminton Championships. It was held at Stade Pierre de Coubertin in Paris, France, from August 23 to August 29, 2010. Following the results of the men's doubles.

Seeds

 Koo Kien Keat / Tan Boon Heong (finalists)
 Markis Kido / Hendra Setiawan (semifinals)
 Mathias Boe / Carsten Mogensen (quarterfinals)
 Guo Zhendong / Xu Chen (semifinals)
 Cai Yun / Fu Haifeng (champions)
 Fang Chieh-min / Lee Sheng-mu(quarterfinals)
 Jung Jae-sung / Lee Yong-dae(quarterfinals)
 Lars Paaske / Jonas Rasmussen (quarterfinals)
 Alvent Yulianto / Hendra Aprida Gunawan (second round)
 Howard Bach / Tony Gunawan (first round)
 Hirokatsu Hashimoto / Noriyasu Hirata (third round)
 Chen Hung-ling / Lin Yu-lang (third round)
 Ko Sung-hyun / Yoo Yeon-seong (third round)
 Chai Biao / Zhang Nan (third round)
 Rupesh Kumar / Sanave Thomas (third round)
 Choong Tan Fook / Lee Wan Wah (first round)

Main stage

Section 1

Section 2

Section 3

Section 4

Final stage

External links
Official website
tournamentsoftware.com

2010 BWF World Championships